Jan Tomeček (born June 27, 1990) is a Czech former professional ice hockey defenceman.

Tomeček played 104 games in the Czech Extraliga for HC Karlovy Vary from 2014 to 2018. He also played on loan for SK Kadaň, HC Most and HC Baník Sokolov. He retired on April 16, 2020 due to health problems.

References

External links

1990 births
Living people
HC Baník Sokolov players
Czech ice hockey defencemen
Sportovní Klub Kadaň players
HC Karlovy Vary players
HC Most players
People from Tábor
Sportspeople from the South Bohemian Region